Deep Wound was an American hardcore punk band formed in 1982 in Westfield, Massachusetts. They released one self-titled 7-inch and contributed two songs to the compilation LP, Bands That Could Be God, both of which are sought after by fans and record collectors alike. The band influenced the Massachusetts hardcore scene and the development of grindcore.

History
In the early 1980s, J Mascis and Deep Wound vocalist Charlie Nakajima lived in Amherst, Massachusetts, and attended the same high school. In 1982, guitarist Lou Barlow met Scott Helland at the Oi! singles bin in a local record shop. Soon after, Scott posted a flier looking for musicians who were influenced by bands such as Anti-Pasti and Discharge. Mascis responded to the ad and was driven by his father to Lou Barlow's place in Westfield for an audition. Although the band already had a singer, Mascis convinced them to replace him with Charlie, and Deep Wound's line-up was complete. The band quickly recorded a demo cassette and began to play shows in Boston with local hardcore bands such as SSD, The F.U.'s, Jerry's Kids, etc. and often opened for hardcore punk bands playing in Western Massachusetts. Shortly thereafter, the band recorded its self-titled EP, released on Radiobeat Records, and contributed two tracks to Gerard Cosloy's Bands That Could Be God compilation. Studio recordings of a later session with Gerard singing have apparently been lost. As the band progressed, they began playing faster and faster, eventually developing a blur-type sound that could verge on experimental noise.

Deep Wound disbanded in 1984 with J Mascis and Lou Barlow going on to form Dinosaur Jr. Barlow later left Dinosaur Jr. and formed Sebadoh, Sentridoh, and Folk Implosion. Scott Helland formed the Outpatients, played bass in Darkside NYC and is now the guitarist for Frenchy and the Punk. Charlie Nakajima later formed Gobblehoof. J Mascis can often be seen sporting a 'Deep Wound' sweater (knitted by his mother) in Dinosaur Jr. photographs.

In April 2004, Sonic Youth played a show at John Green Hall on the Smith College campus in Northampton, Massachusetts with J Mascis and Sebadoh as the opening acts and the anticipation was that the two would reunite for a few Dinosaur Jr. songs. Unexpectedly though, after J Mascis' set, he returned to the stage on drums and Charlie Nakajima came out to address the crowd. Lou Barlow and Scott Helland soon appeared and the stunned audience witnessed a one-song Deep Wound reunion.

In 2005, British record label Damaged Goods released a Discography LP compiling the 1982 demo, self-titled 7-inch and the tracks from Bands That Could Be God.

In June 2013 Helland joined the members of Dinosaur Jr. to perform the song "Training Ground" at the Governor's Ball in New York City.

Lineup
 J Mascis - drums (1982–1984, 2004, 2013)
 Lou Barlow - guitar (1982–1984, 2004, 2013)
 Scott Helland - bass (1982–1984, 2004, 2013)
 Charlie Nakajima - vocals (1982–1984, 2004, 2013)

Discography

EPs
Demo Cassette (1983, Self-released)

Deep Wound 7-inch EP (1983, Radiobeat)

Compilation albums
Deep Wound LP (1997, Damaged Goods)

Almost Complete CD (2006, Baked Goods)

Compilation appearances
Bands That Could Be God (1984, Conflict/Radiobeat) - "Time to Stand", "You're False"

References

External links
Scott Helland official site
Damaged Goods Records
Deep Wound at Kill From the Heart
Bands That Could Be God Comp at Kill From the Heart
Deep Wound at FLEX!

Hardcore punk groups from Massachusetts
Musical groups established in 1982
Musical groups disestablished in 1984
1982 establishments in Massachusetts